John of Gothia  (? –  791 AD) was a Crimean Gothic metropolitan bishop of Doros, and rebel leader who overthrew and briefly expelled the Khazars from Gothia in 787. He was canonized as an Eastern Orthodox saint.

John of Gothia was born to a Crimean Gothic family, the son of Leon and Fotina, in Partenit, Crimea, where he grew up to become a bishop. John went on a pilgrimage to Jerusalem, and stayed there for three years. From there he became a bishop in Georgia in 758, until he returned to Gothia and became metropolitan bishop of Doros.

In 787 John led a revolt against Khazar domination of Gothia. The Khazar garrison and Tudun were expelled from Doros, and the rebels seized the mountain passes leading into the country. The Khazars however managed to retake the city in less than a year, and John was imprisoned in Phoulloi. He later managed to escape, and sought refuge in Amastris in the Byzantine Empire, where he died in 791. His remains were brought home to a church on the Ayu-Dag mountain, Partenit, Crimea, where a memorial to him has been built. John was  canonized as a saint by the Eastern Orthodox Church. His memorial day is 26 June.

See also 
 Metropolitanate of Gothia
 Nicene Christianity

Notes

References 
 Vasiliev, Aleksandr A. The Goths in the Crimea. Cambridge, MA: The Mediaeval Academy of America, 1936.

External links 
 

791 deaths
Eastern Orthodox saints
Crimean Goths
Gothic warriors
8th-century Byzantine bishops
Year of birth unknown
Medieval rebels
Medieval Crimea